Al-Sumayriyya (Katasir in Canaanite times, Someleria during Crusader rule), was a Palestinian village located six kilometers north of Acre that was depopulated after it was captured by the Israel Defense Forces during the 1948 Arab-Israeli War. The ruins of the village are today in the outskirts of the Israeli moshav of Regba.

History

Tall al-Sumayriyya contains carved stones, a mosaic floor, tombs, columns, and stone capitals. Khirbat Abu 'Ataba has an Islamic shrine and ceramic fragments.

In the Crusader era, it was mentioned in 1277 under the name of Somelaria. At the time, the village belonged to the Templars.  In the hudna  of 1283 between Al Mansur Qalawun and the Crusaders, Al-Sumayriyya was still under Crusader rule while in 1291 it had come under Mamluk control.

A  building with a court-yard, measuring 60,5 by 57 meters, dating from the Crusader era, has been noted in the village, and a 13th-century glass-factory has been excavated.

Ottoman era

In 1738 Richard Pococke passed by the place, which he called Semmars. He thought the name came from "St. Mary's", and noted the remains of a wall of hewn stone, which he thought had belonged to a convent.

A map by Pierre Jacotin  from Napoleon's invasion of 1799 showed the place, named as El Esmerieh.

In 1875 Victor Guérin found the village had 400 Muslim inhabitants. 
In 1881,  the PEF's Survey of Western Palestine  described the place as a village of "mud and stone houses, containing about 200 [..] Moslems, situated on the plain, surrounded by a few clumps of olives and figs and arable land; two or three cisterns are in the village, the aqueduct near brings good water."

A population list from about 1887 showed the village to have about 270 inhabitants; all Muslims.

British Mandate era
In the 1922 census of Palestine conducted by the British Mandate authorities Semariyeh  had a population of 307; 300 Muslims and 7 Christians, where all the  Christians were Maronite. This had increased in the 1931 census to 392, 390 Muslims, 1 Christian and 1 Jew, in  a total of 92  houses.

Al-Sumayriyya had an elementary school for boys, which was founded in 1943. In 1945, it had an enrollment of 60 students.
One mosque which remains.

In 1944/1945 the village had a population of 760 Muslims, with a total of 8,542 dunams of land. Of this, 6,854 dunams were allocated to grain crops; 354 dunams were irrigated or planted with orchards, while 28 dunams were built-up (urban) land.

1948, and aftermath
At the beginning of 1945, al-Sumayriyya's 760 inhabitants were all Arab Muslims. The inhabitants fled as a result of the 14 May 1948 assault on the village by the Carmeli Brigade during Operation Ben-Ami, one day before the official outbreak of the 1948 Arab-Israeli War. The village - along with neighbouring al-Bassa and al-Zib which were also captured in the offensive - was subsequently destroyed, except its mosque.

Lohamei HaGeta'ot and Shomrat are both on village land. Morris writes that Bustan HaGalil was built near its site, however,  Khalidi writes that Bustan HaGalil is on the land of Al-Manshiyya. Shavey Tziyon and Regba are close to the northern borders of Al-Sumayriyya, but were established on land that used to belong to Mazra'a.

See also
Depopulated Palestinian locations in Israel

References

Bibliography

  

  
  
 

 

(pp. 229,252253,314,347,350,376,380,381)  
  
 (Pococke, 1745,  vol 2,  p. 54; cited in Pringle, 2009, p. 233

 p. 233
  
 
  p. 251

External links
Welcome To al-Sumayriyya
al-Sumayriyya, Zochrot
Survey of Western Palestine, Map 3:  IAA, Wikimedia commons 
Al-Sumayriyya at Khalil Sakakini Cultural Center
Al-Sumauriyya, Dr. Moslih Kanaaneh
, Umar Ighbariyyeh, 25.4.2009 Zochrot

District of Acre
Arab villages depopulated prior to the 1948 Arab–Israeli War
Arab villages depopulated during the 1948 Arab–Israeli War
1948 disestablishments in Mandatory Palestine